The 2002 AFF U-17 Youth Championship was the inaugural edition of the tournament.  It took place from 19 February to 2 March 2002 with all 10 ASEAN Football Federation members taking part.  It was co-hosted by Malaysia and Indonesia.

Tournament

Group stage

Group A 
All matches played in Malaysia.

Group B 
All matches played in Indonesia

Knockout stage 
All matches played in Malaysia.

Bracket

Semi-finals

Third place play-off

Final

Winner

Notes 
Indonesia have protested against their semi-final loss against Myanmar claiming their opponents fielded over-age players.

References 
Burkert, Sturmius. "ASEAN U-17 Championship 2002" RSSSF. Retrieved 2010-12-11.

U17
AFF U17
AFF U17
AFF U17
2002
2002
2002 in youth association football